The 2001–02 Tetley's Bitter Rugby Union County Championship was the 102nd edition of England's County Championship rugby union club competition. 

Gloucestershire won their 17th title after defeating  Cheshire in the final.

Final

See also
 English rugby union system
 Rugby union in England

References

Rugby Union County Championship
County Championship (rugby union) seasons